Tinel is a surname. Notable people with the surname include:

Edgar Tinel (1854–1912), Belgian classical composer and pianist
Jules Tinel (1879–1952), French neurologist
Tinel's sign

See also
Pinel
Tanel
Tiner